The Eastern Mande languages (called Eastern Eastern Mande by Kastenholz, and Niger–Volta by Schreiber and also known as the Bisa–Busa languages) are a branch of the Mande languages spoken in seven areas: northwest Burkina Faso, the border region of northern Benin and Nigeria, and one language, Bissa, also spoken in Ghana, Togo, and Ivory Coast and the Samo languages also spoken in Mali.

Member languages
Bissa, spoken in Burkina Faso, Ghana, Togo, and Ivory Coast
Boko of Benin and Nigeria
Busa of Nigeria and Benin
Bokobaru of Nigeria
Samo languages (Sane, San, Sa) of Burkina Faso and Mali
Shanga, spoken in Nigeria
Tyenga (Kyenga), spoken in Benin and Nigeria.

Classification
The following internal classification is from Dwyer (1989, 1996), as summarized in Williamson & Blench 2000.

 
Vydrin (2009) places San (Samo) with Bisa.

See also
Proto-Niger-Volta reconstructions (Wiktionary)

References

Mande languages